GreenPower Motor Company Inc. is a Canadian electric bus manufacturer and distributor in North America. The company fabricates multiple zero-emission models, including transit buses, school buses, and double decker buses. GreenPower headquarters are in Vancouver, British Columbia, with a sales office in Rancho Cucamonga, California; an assembly facility in Porterville, California; and a production facility in  South Charleston, West Virginia. Its stock is traded on Nasdaq the United States.

Its subsidiaries include Electric Vehicle Logistics Inc., GreenPower Industries Inc., GreenPower Manufacturing WV Inc., GreenPower Motor Company, Inc., Green-Power Private Ltd., Lion Truck Body Incorporated, and San Joaquin Valley Equipment Leasing, Inc.

History

GreenPower was incorporated in Canada in 2010 to manufacture affordable electric buses and vans.

In 2014, GreenPower launched an EV350 model, a forty-foot, all-electric transit bus combining electric drive and battery technologies with a lightweight chassis and low-floor body. The EV350 was designed by Xiamen Fengtai Bus & Coach International Co., Ltd in China. It was assembled by Fengtai and imported in July 2014 through the Port of Long Beach. The prototype unit was subsequently used as a demonstration unit for transit agencies in the western United States and Canada.

In 2016, the Greater Victoria Harbour Authority and CVS Tours in Victoria, British Columbia purchased a double-decker EV550 bus from GreenPower for US $1.3 million. It was the first purpose-built double-decker electric bus in North America.

In 2016, the company acquired a  plot on Hope Drive in Porterville, California, to build a  manufacturing facility for roughly $10 million. The firm stated it would initially have sixty employees, but project growth to 1,000 workers. In March 2017, the City of Porterville, California, ordered ten GreenPower EV350 buses and charging infrastructure for nine million dollars. With this purchase, Porterville became the first municipality to operated an all-electric and zero-emission transit fleet in California. However, in April 2021, GreenPower had yet to construct its manufacturing facility.

In the fall of 2016. GreenPower released Synapse, the line of all-electric school and shuttle buses. The Synapse has a   model that seats 37 passengers and a  model that seats 49 passengers. The California Air Resources Board approved the Synapse for its Hybrid and Zero-Emission Truck and Bus Voucher Incentive Project. This approval meant purchasers of the Synapse would earn a $95,000 incentive, in addition to other, previously existing incentives. In August 2017, GreenPower sold eleven Synapse buses to six schools in the North Coast Unified Air Quality Management District and South Coast Air Quality Management District in California.

In 2018, GreenPower launched the EV Star minibus in 2018. Several interior configurations are possible, including one that seats seventeen passengers. The University of California, San Francisco purchased two EV Stars. Its cost ranges from US $190,000 to US $240,000 before federal and state incentives.

In 2020, the Thermalito Union Elementary School District in Thermalito, California ordered six BEAST (Battery Electric Automotive School Transportation) school buses from GreenPower. According to a GreenPower statement, it was the company's largest delivery of school buses to date.

In August 2020, GreenPower issued stock through Nasdaq; shares started at $8, rose to $34, and declined to $18 by April 2021. Delays in the company's growth were in part due to GreenPower's "refusal to carry out accepted crash tests on their large buses—a requirement for federal funds that transit agencies use to buy the vehicles." In addition, GreenPower's vehicles are manufactured in China, with minor modifications being made in the United States, meaning they were not compliant with President Biden's "Buy America" program. The federal government gives agencies funds towards electric bus purchases, but 75% of the vehicle's parts must be made in the United States to comply to Buy America.

In 2021, GreenPower entered into an exclusive agreement with Forest River, a manufacturer of cutaway minibusses and recreational vehicles. GreenPower EV Star cabs and chassis to Forest River.

In August 2022, GreenPower opened a production facility in the South Charleston Industrial Park in South Charleston, West Virginia. GreenPower leased a  building where it plans to manufacture electric buses. The Workforce Development Board of Kanawha County offered BridgeValley Community and Technical College students funding for training, transportation, books, and childcare to prepare for employment with GreenPower.

Vehicles

Minibuses

 EV Star
 EV Star Max seating
 EV Star Cargo
 EV Star Cab
 EV Star CC

School bus

 BEAST. (Battery Electric Automotive School Transportation)
 Nano BEAST
 Synapse

Transit and coach buses

 EV250
 EV350
 EV500
 EV550 (double-decker)

References

2010 establishments in Canada
Electric bus manufacturers
School bus manufacturers
Bus manufacturers of Canada
Companies listed on the TSX Venture Exchange
Electric vehicle manufacturers of Canada
Companies listed on the Nasdaq